Norm DeBriyn (born October 31, 1942) is an American former baseball coach at the University of Arkansas. He led the Arkansas Razorbacks baseball team for 33 years, beginning in 1970. During his tenure, which ended after the 2002 season, DeBriyn's teams achieved three conference championships, 15 NCAA tournament appearances, and four College World Series. His Razorbacks fell two runs short of winning the 1979 College World Series.

When DeBriyn retired, his record (1161-650-6) was the fourteenth-best all-time in college baseball.

Personal life
Norm DeBriyn is a native of Ashland, Wisconsin, and graduated from the University of Wisconsin–Oshkosh with a B.S. in history in 1963. He currently resides in Fayetteville, Arkansas, home of the Razorbacks.

DeBriyn is a Roman Catholic Deacon for the Catholic Church in Arkansas.  He was ordained on November 17, 2012.

Team accomplishments
Under Norm DeBriyn, Arkansas won three conference championships, appeared in fifteen NCAA tournaments, and four College World Series. Before DeBriyn, Arkansas had never played in an NCAA tournament. He also coached several future MLB stars, including Eric Hinske, Tom Pagnozzi, Kevin McReynolds, and Cliff Lee, winner of the Cy Young Award for 2008. DeBriyn was also instrumental to building the program as a whole, beginning with practices at the fairgrounds and retiring in Baum Stadium, one of the United States's premiere college baseball facilities.

Head coaching record

Source: Hog Haven Baseball Year-by-Year Record

See also
List of college baseball coaches with 1,100 wins
Dave van Horn, player and later graduate assistant under DeBriyn, succeeded him as Razorbacks head coach
Ron Polk, Mississippi State baseball legend, and friend of DeBriyn
Cliff Gustafson, longtime rival of DeBriyn at Texas

References

1942 births
Living people
Arkansas Razorbacks baseball coaches
University of Wisconsin–Oshkosh alumni
People from Ashland, Wisconsin
Sportspeople from Fayetteville, Arkansas